East Carteret High School is a public high school located in Beaufort, North Carolina. It serves 13 Down East communities, Merrimon, South River, North River, and Beaufort. Harkers Island is zoned to East Carteret High.

Athletics
East Carteret High School athletics teams compete in the Coastal Plains Conference. Their colors are gold, blue, and white and their mascot is the mariner. East Carteret offers baseball, basketball, football, soccer, softball, tennis, wrestling, and volleyball.

State championships 

 Boys basketball
 2015 1A NCHSAA State Champions

Demographics
As of the 2018–2019 school year, East Carteret enrolled 526 students. 422 identified as white, 54 identified as black, 22 identified as multiracial, 17 identified as Hispanic, seven identified as Asian, two identified as American Indian/Alaska Native, and two identified as Native Hawaiian/Pacific Islander.

References

External links

Public high schools in North Carolina